Jamie Slocum was an American Christian worship leader, singer, songwriter and producer from Grants Pass, Oregon. He was raised in Phoenix, Arizona and moved to Nashville in the 1990s. Slocum succumbed to injuries after being run over by a bus in Scottsdale, Arizona on January 10, 2023.  He was 52 at the time of his death. 

 He started as a staff songwriter for Curb Records. Music Mogul Mike Curb thought Slocum should be doing his own music, which led to a record deal. Slocum continues to tour and produce records internationally. He is currently on Curb records in Nashville, where he resides with his family.

Slocum has written and produced many hit songs for Country/Pop and Christian music as well as many jingles. "Grace Changes Everything" was his first hit as a solo artist and climbed to No. 7 (AC radio 2000).

Jamie Slocum's single " Dependence" (Curb 2009) was a number No. 1 hit for 11 weeks on light AC radio.  His latest album, "Dependence" also arrived in 2011 The "expanded edition" also includes more new music and his latest hit song " Just Another Mountain".( Dependence "expanded edition" was Slocum's first number # 1 album 6-11-11)  

The title cut was nominated for "Inspirational Song of the Year" for the Dove Awards.  Also from the same album, "Fragile" became a top ten song on Billboard light AC radio in March 2010. "Dependence" "Fragile " and "Just Another Mountain" are all featured videos where they reach a broader market.

In March 2011, Curb Records released a brand new Slocum worship song and video called "Just Another Mountain," ( top ten hit 6-12-11) with plans for a tour. In 2016,
Jamie Slocum has a brand-new Cd titled Safe and will be released on April 1, 2016 On Curb records.  The music is Slocum's first release in four years it was also produced  and arranged by Jamie. A tour will follow. Reviewers and critics are calling this Jamie's best work to date.

Discography
Slocum's first album entitled Somewhere Under Heaven, produced by Keith Olsen and himself, was recorded and mixed at "Goodnight L.A" studios.  The CD has been considered more pop leaning than his later works, which are more decidedly Contemporary Christian.  It  featured Elliot Easton (of The Cars), Alex Ligertwood (of Santana), Richard Baker on keyboards and programming and Tim Pierce on guitars, and garnered Slocum a Dove nomination for "New Artist of the Year."

Slocum's second album was Grace Changes Everything (2000) on "Freedom Records." Slocum produced the album himself, and gained his first major hit with the title track.  The album featured "Wounded," and a cover version of "Bless the Broken Road."  The album additionally features a Norman Greenbaum classic predating Slocum's own birth, "Spirit in the Sky."  His follow-up album was My Heart Knows (2003) on Curb Records, which included two number one songs, "By Your Side" and "I Cannot Turn Away." The album Dependence was also released through Curb in April 2009, with hits "Dependence" and "Fragile."

In September 2011, Jamie Slocum's music was used in the film " Breaking the Press" (20th Century Fox)
Jamie's songs " Dependence" and Jesus take my Hand" ( CURB records) were both in the film. The later was the theme song.

In August 2012, a new song from Jamie Slocum's upcoming 2013 CURB Project titled:  "You are the reason" is released to radio from CURB records. Song was Produced By Jamie Slocum and written by Jamie Slocum and Chicago lead singer and bass player Jason Scheff.

Footnotes

Sources

American performers of Christian music
American country singer-songwriters
Living people
Record producers from Oregon
Country musicians from Oregon
People from Grants Pass, Oregon
Curb Records artists
Singer-songwriters from Oregon
Year of birth missing (living people)